This is a list of schools in the National Association of Intercollegiate Athletics (NAIA) that have football as a varsity sport. In the 2023 season, there are a total of 94 NAIA fotball programs.

NAIA football programs

Future NAIA football programs

See also
List of NAIA institutions
NAIA Football National Championship
List of NAIA National Football Championship Series appearances by team
NAIA lacrosse
List of NCAA Division I FBS football programs
List of NCAA Division I FCS football programs
List of NCAA Division II football programs
List of NCAA Division III football programs
List of community college football programs
List of NCAA institutions with club football teams
List of NCAA Division I schools that have never sponsored football
List of defunct college football teams

References

Naia